Hephaestio of Thebes (born AD 380) was an ancient writer on astrology. He wrote the Apotelesmatics, which relies heavily on the work of Ptolemy and Dorotheus of Sidon.

Notes

External links
Apotelesmatics, 3 books Original Greek text

Ancient Greek astronomers
380 births
Year of death unknown